Stadttheater Düren  was a theatre in Düren, North Rhine-Westphalia, Germany.

The house was built from 1905 to 1907 to a design by Carl Moritz, the architect of the opera house in Cologne, on what is now the Hoeschplatz. A Düren businessman, Eberhard Hoesch, had donated 500,000 Marks for a new theatre; until then performances had been held at inns. After only 14 months of construction, the theatre opened on 17 January 1907. The house in Jugendstil style seated 700 people. The theatre had no permanent ensemble but housed visiting performances, including by actors Willy Birgel, Paul Henckels and Asta Nielsen, pianist Elly Ney and conductor Herbert von Karajan.

The theatre was destroyed by bombing in World War II on 16 November 1944. Only the basement and the facade remained. The ruin was demolished in 1952, using the stones for the walls of a cemetery in the Kölnstraße.

Theatre performances were resumed in various venues, first on 25 April 1946 in a hall of a hospital (today: LVR-Klinik Düren), then in the hall of the gymnasium Stiftisches Gymnasium, from 30 November 1991 in the municipal Haus der Stadt.

External links 
Theater in Düren, photograph of 1912, Dachziegel-Katalog (Ludowici)
Stadttheater Düren on old postcards, andreas-praefcke.de

Theatres in North Rhine-Westphalia
Theatres completed in 1907
Art Nouveau architecture in Germany
Art Nouveau theatres
1907 establishments in Germany
Buildings and structures in Düren (district)
Buildings and structures demolished in 1952
Buildings and structures in Germany destroyed during World War II